Rinderpest (also cattle plague or steppe murrain) was an infectious viral disease of cattle, domestic buffalo, and many other species of even-toed ungulates, including gaurs, buffaloes, large antelope, deer, giraffes, wildebeests, and warthogs. The disease was characterized by fever, oral erosions, diarrhea, lymphoid necrosis, and high mortality. Death rates during outbreaks were usually extremely high, approaching 100% in immunologically naïve populations. Rinderpest was mainly transmitted by direct contact and by drinking contaminated water, although it could also be transmitted by air. After a global eradication campaign starting in the mid-20th century, the last confirmed case of rinderpest was diagnosed in 2001.

On 14 October 2010, the United Nations Food and Agriculture Organization (FAO) announced that field activities in the decades-long, worldwide campaign to eradicate the disease were ending, paving the way for a formal declaration in June 2011 of the global eradication of rinderpest. On 25 May 2011, the World Organisation for Animal Health announced the free status of the last eight countries not yet recognized (a total of 198 countries were now free of the disease), officially declaring the eradication of the disease. In June 2011, the United Nations FAO confirmed the disease was eradicated, making rinderpest only the second disease in history to be fully wiped out (outside laboratory stocks), following smallpox. In June 2019 the UK destroyed its stocks of rinderpest virus, held at the Pirbright Institute in Surrey, which were most of the world's retained samples. This followed the completion of a digital record of the virus's genetic code, thereby obviating the need to store samples as a protective resource in case the virus re-emerges. Researchers at Pirbright and the United Nations expressed a hope that the other samples in laboratories around the world will also be destroyed, totally eradicating the virus from the Earth.

Rinderpest is believed to have originated in Asia, later spreading through the transport of cattle. The term Rinderpest is a German word meaning "cattle-plague". The rinderpest virus (RPV) is closely related to the measles and canine distemper viruses. The measles virus possibly emerged from rinderpest as a zoonotic disease around 600 BC, a period that coincides with the rise of large human settlements.

Virus
Rinderpest virus (RPV), a member of the genus Morbillivirus, is closely related to the measles and canine distemper viruses. Like other members of the Paramyxoviridae family, it produces enveloped virions, and is a negative-sense single-stranded RNA virus. The virus is particularly fragile and is quickly inactivated by heat, desiccation and sunlight.

Measles virus evolved from the then-widespread rinderpest virus most probably between the 11th and 12th centuries. The earliest likely origin is during the seventh century; some linguistic evidence exists for this earlier origin.

Disease and symptoms

Death rates during outbreaks were usually extremely high, approaching 100% in immunologically naïve populations. The disease was mainly spread by direct contact and by drinking contaminated water, although it could also be transmitted by air.

Initial symptoms include fever, loss of appetite, and nasal and eye discharges. Subsequently, irregular erosions appear in the mouth, the lining of the nose, and the genital tract. Acute diarrhea, preceded by constipation, is also a common feature. Most animals die six to twelve days after the onset of these clinical signs.

History and epizootics

Early history
The disease is believed to have originated in Asia, later spreading through the transport of cattle. Other cattle epizootics are noted in ancient times: a cattle plague is thought to be one of the 10 plagues of Egypt described in the Hebrew Bible. By around 3,000 BC, a cattle plague had reached Egypt, and rinderpest later spread throughout the remainder of Africa, following European colonization.

In the 4th century, Roman writer Severus Sanctus Endelechius described rinderpest in his book, On the Deaths of Cattle.

18th century
Cattle plagues recurred throughout history, often accompanying wars and military campaigns. They hit Europe especially hard in the 18th century, with three long panzootics, which although varying in intensity and duration from region to region, took place in the periods of 1709–1720, 1742–1760, and 1768–1786.

Inoculation
In the early 18th century, the disease was seen as similar to smallpox, due to its analogous symptoms. The personal physician of the pope, Giovanni Maria Lancisi, recommended the destruction of all infected and exposed animals. This policy was not very popular and was used only sparingly in the first part of the century. Later, it was used successfully in several countries, although it was sometimes seen as too costly or drastic, and depended on a strong central authority to be effective (which was notably lacking in the Dutch Republic). Because of these downsides, numerous attempts were made to inoculate animals against the disease. These attempts met with varying success, but the procedure was not widely used and was no longer practiced at all in 19th-century Western or Central Europe. Rinderpest was an immense problem, but inoculation was not a valid solution. In many cases, it caused too many losses. Even more importantly, it perpetuated the circulation of the virus in the cattle population. The pioneers of inoculation did contribute significantly to knowledge about infectious diseases. Their experiments confirmed the concepts of those who saw infectious diseases as caused by specific agents, and were the first to recognize maternally derived immunity.

Early English experimentation
The first written report of rinderpest inoculation was published in a letter signed "T.S." in the November 1754 issue of The Gentleman's Magazine, a widely read journal which also supported the progress of smallpox inoculation. This letter reported that a Mr Dobsen had inoculated his cattle and had thus preserved 9 out of 10 of them, although this was retracted in the next issue, as it was apparently a Sir William St. Quintin who had done the inoculating (this was done by placing bits of material previously dipped in morbid discharge into an incision made in the dewlap of the animal). These letters encouraged further application of inoculation in the fight against diseases. The first inoculation against measles was made three years after their publication.

From early 1755 onwards, experiments were taking place in the Netherlands, as well, results of which were also published in The Gentleman's Magazine. As in England, the disease was seen as analogous with smallpox. While these experiments were reasonably successful, they did not have a significant impact: The total number of inoculations in England appears to have been very limited, and after 1780, the English interest in inoculation disappeared almost entirely. Almost all further experimentation was done in the Netherlands, northern Germany and Denmark.

Further trials in the Netherlands
Due to a very severe outbreak at the end of the 1760s, some of the best-known names in Dutch medicine became involved in the struggle against the disease. Several independent trials were begun, most notably by Pieter Camper in Groningen and Friesland. The results of his experiment in Friesland were encouraging, but they proved to be the exception; testing by others in the provinces of Utrecht and Friesland obtained disastrous results. As a result, the Frisian authorities concluded in 1769 that the cause of rinderpest was God's displeasure with the sinful behavior of the Frisian people, and proclaimed 15 November a day of fasting and prayer. Interest in inoculation declined sharply across the country.

In this climate of discouragement and scepticism, Geert Reinders, a farmer in the province of Groningen and a self-taught man, decided to continue the experiments. He collaborated with Wijnold Munniks, who had supervised earlier trials. They tried different inoculation procedures and a variety of treatments to lighten the symptoms, all of them without significant effect. Although they were not able to perfect the inoculation procedure, they did make some useful observations.

Reinders resumed his experiments in 1774, concentrating on the inoculation of calves from cows that had recovered from rinderpest. He was probably the first to make practical use of maternally derived immunity. The detailed results of his trials were published in 1776 and reprinted in 1777. His inoculation procedure did not differ much from what had been used previously, except for the use of three separate inoculations at an early age. This produced far better results, and the publication of his work renewed interest in inoculation. For the period of 1777 to 1781, 89% of inoculated animals survived, compared to a 29% survival rate after natural infection.

In the Netherlands, too, interest in rinderpest inoculation declined in the 1780s because the disease itself decreased in intensity.

In other countries
Apart from the Dutch Republic, the only other regions where inoculation was used to any significant level were northern Germany and Denmark. Experiments started in Mecklenburg during the epizootic of the late 1770s. "Insurance companies" were created which provided inoculation in special "institutes". Although these were private initiatives, they were created with full encouragement from the authorities. Though neighboring states followed this practice with interest, the practice never caught on outside Mecklenburg; many were still opposed to inoculation.

While some experimentation occurred in other countries (most extensively in Denmark), in the majority of European countries, the struggle against the disease was based on stamping it out. Sometimes this could be done with minimal sacrifices; at other times, it required slaughter at a massive scale.

19th century

A major outbreak affected the whole of the British Isles for three years after 1865.

Around the turn of the century, a plague struck in Southern Africa. The outbreak in the 1890s killed an estimated 80 to 90% of all cattle in eastern and southern Africa. Sir Arnold Theiler was instrumental in developing a vaccine that curbed the epizootic. The loss of animals caused famine which depopulated sub-Saharan Africa, allowing thornbush to colonise. This formed ideal habitat for tsetse fly, which carries sleeping sickness, and is unsuitable for livestock; "hence the European view of an empty unspoiled Africa teeming with game".

20th century
In his classic study of the Nuer of southern Sudan, E. E. Evans-Pritchard suggested rinderpest might have affected the Nuer's social organization before and during the 1930s. Since the Nuer were pastoralists, much of their livelihood was based on cattle husbandry, and bride-prices were paid in cattle; prices may have changed as a result of cattle depletion. Rinderpest might also have increased dependence on horticulture among the Nuer.

A more recent rinderpest outbreak in Africa in 1982–1984 resulted in an estimated US$2 billion in stock losses.

Vaccination
In 1917–18, William Hutchins Boynton (1881–1959), the chief veterinary pathologist with the Philippine Bureau of Agriculture, developed an early vaccine for rinderpest, based on treated animal organ extracts.

Walter Plowright worked on a vaccine for the RBOK strain of the rinderpest virus for about a decade, from 1956 to 1962. Plowright was awarded the World Food Prize in 1999 for developing a vaccine against a strain of rinderpest. In 1999, the FAO predicted that with vaccination, rinderpest would be eradicated by 2010.

Eradication

Widespread eradication efforts began in the early 20th century although, until the 1950s, they mostly took place on an individual country basis, using vaccination campaigns. In 1924, the World Organisation for Animal Health (OIE) was formed in response to rinderpest.  In 1950, the Inter-African Bureau of Epizootic Diseases was formed, with the stated goal of eliminating rinderpest from Africa. With the loss of its wildebeest population, the Serengeti experienced radical fire regime shift to intense annual wildfires. During the 1960s, a program called JP 15 attempted to vaccinate all cattle in participating countries and, by 1979, only one of the countries involved, Sudan, reported cases of rinderpest. In the decades since the wildebeest have returned to the Serengeti and tree cover has returned with them.

In 1969, an outbreak of the disease originated in Afghanistan, travelling westwards and promoting a mass vaccination plan, which by 1972, had eliminated rinderpest in all areas of Asia except for Lebanon and India; both countries were the site of further occurrences of the disease in the 1980s.

During the 1980s, however, an outbreak of rinderpest from Sudan spread throughout Africa, killing millions of cattle, as well as wildlife. In response, the Pan-African Rinderpest Campaign was initiated in 1987, using vaccination and surveillance to combat the disease. By the 1990s, nearly all of Africa, with the exception of parts of Sudan and Somalia, was declared free of rinderpest.

Worldwide, the Global Rinderpest Eradication Programme was initiated in 1994, supported by the Food and Agriculture Organization, the OIE, and the International Atomic Energy Agency. This program was successful in reducing rinderpest outbreaks to few and far between by the late 1990s. The program is estimated to have saved affected farmers 58 million net euros.

The end was in sight by 2000 when only the Horn of Africa and Pakistan appeared to have a continued presence. Mariner et al., 2000 introduced participatory disease surveillance to rinderpest efforts. The last confirmed case of rinderpest was reported in Kenya in 2001. Since then, while no cases have been confirmed, the disease is believed to have been present in parts of Somalia past that date. The final vaccinations were administered in 2006, and the last surveillance operations took place in 2009, failing to find any evidence of the disease.

The Mariner method continued to be used in those two locations (the Horn and Pakistan) to track down possible lingering refugia in the coming years. In 2008, scientists involved in rinderpest eradication efforts believed a good chance existed that rinderpest would join smallpox as officially "wiped off the face of the planet". The FAO, which had been co-ordinating the global eradication program for the disease, announced in November 2009 that it expected the disease to be eradicated within 18 months.

In October 2010, the FAO announced it was confident the disease has been eradicated. The agency said that "[a]s of mid 2010, FAO is confident that the rinderpest virus has been eliminated from Europe, Asia, Middle East, Arabian Peninsula, and Africa," which were the locations where the virus had been last reported. Eradication was confirmed by the World Organization for Animal Health on 25 May 2011.

On 28 June 2011, FAO and its members countries officially recognized global freedom from the deadly cattle virus. On this day, the FAO Conference, the highest body of the UN agency, adopted a resolution declaring the eradication of rinderpest. The resolution also called on the world community to follow up by ensuring that samples of rinderpest viruses and vaccines be kept under safe laboratory conditions and that rigorous standards for disease surveillance and reporting be applied. "While we are celebrating one of the greatest successes for FAO and its partners, I wish to remind you that this extraordinary achievement would not have been possible without the joint efforts and strong commitments of governments, the main organizations in Africa, Asia and Europe, and without the continuous support of donors and international institutions", FAO Director-General Jacques Diouf commented.

The rinderpest eradication effort is estimated to have cost $5 billion.

Stocks of the rinderpest virus are still maintained by highly specialized laboratories. In 2015, FAO launched a campaign calling for the destruction or sequestering of the remaining stocks of rinderpest virus in laboratories in 24 countries, citing risks of inadvertent or malicious release.

On 14 June 2019, the largest stock of the rinderpest virus was destroyed at the Pirbright Institute.

Use as a biological weapon
Rinderpest was one of more than a dozen agents the United States government researched as potential biological weapons before terminating its biological weapons program.

Rinderpest is of concern as a biological weapon for the following reasons:
 The disease has high rates of morbidity and mortality.
 The disease is highly communicable and spreads rapidly once introduced into nonimmune herds.
 Cattle herds are no longer immunized against RPV, so are susceptible to infection.

Rinderpest was also considered as a biological weapon in a United Kingdom government programme during World War II.

See also

 Murrain
 Ovine rinderpest
 Rift Valley fever
 Smallpox

Footnotes

General references

External links

 The IAEA's activities with rinderpest 
 Rinderpest reviewed and published by WikiVet
 FAO Maintaining Global Freedom from Rinderpest
 OIE Rinderpest disease card

Animal viral diseases
Biological anti-agriculture weapons
Bovine diseases
Eradicated diseases